The 2015 WNWBL season was the 16th season of competition since its establishment in 2000. A total of 5 teams contested the league. The regular season was played between 8 May 2015 and 12 July 2015, followed by a post-season involving the top four from 7 to 9 August 2015 at the Herb Graham Recreation Centre in Mirrabooka, Western Australia.

Team standings
 Source:

Finals

Source:

Season awards

References

Women's National Wheelchair Basketball League
2015–16 in Australian basketball
2014–15 in Australian basketball
2015 in wheelchair basketball
2015 in women's basketball